Fort Uncompahgre was a fur trading post constructed in 1828 by Antoine Robidoux, a trader based out of Mexican Santa Fe.  The post was situated about two miles down from the confluence of the Gunnison River and the Uncompahgre River, near the present day community of Delta, Colorado. Its design was more to secure goods and livestock than to be defensive, and was abandoned in 1844 when hostilities broke out between Ute and Mexicans.

A reconstruction of this fur trading post is open to the public, although the precise location of the original site has been lost and little is known about the construction or layout of the fort.

See also
 History of Colorado
 Fort Robidoux, northeastern Utah

References

Further reading
 Antoine Robidoux and Fort Uncompahgre,  Ken Reyher,  Western Reflections Publishing Co.

Uncompahgre